Meritt may refer to:

People 
 Benjamin Dean Meritt (1899–1989), American classical scholar
 Harry Meritt (1920–2004), English footballer
 Lucy Taxis Shoe Meritt (1906–2003), American archaeologist
 Paul Meritt (1843–1895), British dramatist
 Meritt H. Steger (1906–1998), General Counsel of the United States Navy

Other uses 
 Meritt Records (1925), American jazz and blues record label active 1925 to 1929
 Meritt Records (1979), American jazz record label founded 1979
 Meritt, California, now spelled Merritt

See also 
 Merit (disambiguation)
 Merrit (disambiguation)
 Merritt (disambiguation)